XHPCCC-FM is a radio station on 103.3 FM in Ciudad Cuauhtémoc, Chihuahua, Mexico, owned by Multimedios Radio.

History
XHPCCC was awarded in the IFT-4 radio auction of 2017 and came to air on October 25 of that year, initially with the Hits FM pop format. Hits FM had previously been heard in Cuauhtémoc on XHDT-FM 98.3 as part of an affiliation agreement with that station's owner, GRD Multimedia.

In August 2018, XHPCCC was flipped to La Lupe, Multimedios's Spanish adult hits format.

In June 1, 2022, XHPCCC was leased out to Voz y Visión Radio, which runs a mix of pirates and leased stations in Chihuahua. Previously, in 2021, it had leased Grupo BM Radio stations XHRCH-FM and XHSBT-FM elsewhere in the state.

References

Christian radio stations in Mexico
Radio stations in Chihuahua
Radio stations established in 2017
2017 establishments in Mexico
Multimedios Radio